The British Women's Ice Hockey Friendship Tournament has been running for 16 consecutive years every June in Swindon, Wiltshire, United Kingdom at the Link Centre.

Overview

The tournament is currently organised by English Becci Hargreves, Michael Armstrong and their team of helpers from Swindon.

Participating teams

2009
Basingstoke Bison Ladies
Bracknell Queen Bees (runner up)
Bracknell FireBees
Cardiff Comets
Chelmsford Cobras
Coventry Phoenix
Guildford Lightning ('winner')
Invicta Dynamics
Milton Keynes Falcons
Peterborough Penguins
Telford Wrekin Raiders
Swindon Topcats

2008
Bracknell Queen Bees (winner)
Slough Phantoms (runner-up)
Basingstoke Bison
Bracknell FireBees
Cardiff Comets
Chelmsford Cobras
Coventry Phoenix
Flintshire Furies
Invicta Dynamics
Oxford MidnightStars
Streatham Storm A
Streatham Storm B
Swindon Topcats
Telford Wrekin Raiders

2007
Slough Phantoms (winner)
Swindon Topcats (runner-up)
Basingstoke Bison
Bracknell FireBees
Bracknell Queen Bees
Cardiff Comets
Coventry Phoenix
Guildford Lightning
Oxford University
Streatham Storm A
Streatham Storm B
Telford Wrekin Raiders

2006
Cardiff Comets (winner)
Bracknell Queen Bees (runner-up)
Chelmsford Cobras
Coventry Phoenix
Flintshire Furies
Guildford Lightning
Invicta Dynamics
Oxford City Zodiacs
Slough Phantoms
Streatham Storm A
Streatham Storm B
Swindon Topcats

2005
Cardiff Comets (winner)
Bracknell Queen Bees (runner-up)
Basingstoke Bison
Flintshire Furies
Guildford Lightning
Invicta Dynamics
Milton Keynes Falcons
Oxford City Zodiacs
Oxford University
Streatham Storm
Swindon Topcats
Telford Wrekin Raiders

2004
Bracknell Queen Bees (winner)
Swindon Topcats (runner-up)
Blackburn Thunder
Flintshire Furies
Guildford Lightning
Invicta Dynamics
Milton Keynes Falcons
Oxford City Zodiacs
Romford Nighthawks
Sheffield Shadows
Streatham Storm
Telford Wrekin Raiders

Ice hockey competitions in England
Women's ice hockey competitions in Europe
Women's sports competitions in the United Kingdom